Denis Garcia Mandarino (born May 7, 1964) is a Brazilian composer, artist and writer, and a disciple of Hans-Joachim Koellreutter in choral conducting and aesthetics.

He proposed a theory about four-dimensional perception, which states the concepts behind the renaissance perspective involving four dimensions instead of three dimensions assigned to it. These studies culminated in the development of the method of the four-dimensional perspective.

Mandarino wrote the Versatilist manifesto (2007).

Versatilism

Versatilism is an artistic movement proposed in 2007, from a literary manifesto, with the intention of freeing people from the expert analysis and promoting the practice of art as a form of self-knowledge and spiritual enhancement. 
<blockquote>
"New ideas are hard to identify, hard to assimilate, and only detachment may be able to evaluate them in a more open way. When a man assumes the role of giving the verdict about what artists are doing, or the society gives him this role, we are one step closer to repeat the greatest injustices that men of science, philosophy, arts and religion have suffered throughout history." – Interview about the Versatilist Manifesto</blockquote>

Four-dimensional perspective
After spending four years writing the Theory of four-dimensional perception (1995), Mandarino developed a new method, in a subject for many years stagnant. In the perspective of four dimensions, the observer is not a static element (fixed point), as one sees in traditional processes.

In Observation in time (1997) can be found nine different vanishing points and horizon lines, representing different moments of an observer who turns his head and moves vertically and horizontally.

This kind of painting admits curved or spherical canvas.

 Discography 
The discography includes the following albums:
 Volume 1 – 2003
 Tributo – 2004
 Peças para Violão – 2005
 Instrumental – 2006
 Musa – 2007
 Renascentieval – 2008
 A Sociedade do Rei e o Xadrez – 2009
 Um toque de humor – 2009
 Improvisos, variações, releituras... – 2010
 Reconstruções – 2011
 Tributo 2 – 2012
 Versátil'' – 2013

Gallery

Portraits

Guardians

References

External links 

  English-Portugues.pdf Full transcription, (in English).
 
 
 
 

Música Popular Brasileira guitarists
Brazilian composers
Brazilian painters
Brazilian male writers
1964 births
Living people